James Lorimer may refer to:

 James Lorimer (Australian politician) (1831–1889)
 James Lorimer (South African politician) (born 1962)
 James Lorimer (advocate) (1818–1890), Scottish advocate and professor of public law
 James Gibson Lorimer (1923–2012), lawyer and political figure in British Columbia
 James J. Lorimer, American attorney and Arnold Festival co-founder

See also 
 James Lorimer Ilsley (1894–1967), Canadian politician and jurist